Aghol Beyk, also rendered as Aghalbak or Aqalbak or Ogholbeyg or Oghol Beyg or Oghul Beyg or Ogholbeyk or Owghli Beyg or Owghol Beyg, may refer to:
 Aghol Beyk-e Olya
 Aghol Beyk-e Sofla
 Ogholbeyk-e Duzkand
 Oghul Beyg, West Azerbaijan